The Carnegie Museum of Kings County, is a museum in Hanford, Kings County, central California.

History
The building was built in 1905 in the Romanesque Revival style with Richardson Romanesque elements. It was one of the many Carnegie libraries that were funded by steel magnate Andrew Carnegie, who awarded the city $12,500 to construct it.

The Hanford Library was open in the Carnegie building until 1968, when the city and Kings County libraries were combined and moved into a new building. Local citizens raised the money to save the old library building from destruction and to renovate it.

Museum
The Hanford Carnegie Museum opened in the restored Carnegie Library building in 1974. In 2021, the Museum name was changed to The Carnegie Museum of Kings County, to reflect the Museum intent to present a larger community history. The history museum has displays of Kings County’s people and institutions, to illustrate and explain the history of King’s County and the area in the western San Joaquin Valley.

See also
 List of Carnegie libraries in California
 National Register of Historic Places listings in Kings County, California

References

External links
Museum website

Carnegie libraries in California
History museums in California
Museums in Kings County, California
Library buildings completed in 1905
Libraries on the National Register of Historic Places in California
Former library buildings in the United States
Richardsonian Romanesque architecture in California
Hanford, California
National Register of Historic Places in Kings County, California
1905 establishments in California